Non Thai is a district (amphoe) of Nakhon Ratchasima province, northeastern Thailand.

History
Originally, the area was Khwaeng San Thia (แขวงสันเทียะ). San Thia is Khmer, meaning 'a place to gather salt'. The name refers to the tradition of salt production in the area.

In 1900, Khwaeng San Thia was changed to a district and renamed Non Lao. The following year it was named San Thia. In 1919, the district name was changed to Non Lao again. Finally in the phase of Thai nationalism under Field Marshal Plaek Phibunsongkhram, the district name was changed to Non Thai in 1939 to remove the reference to the Lao population in the name.

Geography
Neighbouring districts are (from the north clockwise): Phra Thong Kham, Kham Sakaesaeng, Non Sung, Mueang Nakhon Ratchasima, Kham Thale So, and Dan Khun Thot.

Administration

Central administration 
Non Thai is divided into 10 sub-districts (tambons), which are further subdivided into 133 administrative villages (mubans).

Missing numbers are tambon which now form Phra Thong Kham District.

Local administration 
There are three sub-district municipalities (thesaban tambons) in the district:
 Khok Sawai consisting of parts of sub-district Sai O.
 Non Thai consisting of parts of sub-district Non Thai.
 Banlang consisting of sub-district Banlang.

There are nine sub-district administrative organizations (SAO) in the district:
 Non Thai consisting of parts of sub-district Non Thai.
 Dan Chak consisting of sub-district Dan Chak.
 Kampang consisting of sub-district Kampang.
 Samrong consisting of sub-district Samrong.
 Khang Phlu consisting of sub-district Khang Phlu.
 Ban Wang consisting of sub-district Ban Wang.
 Sai O consisting of parts of sub-district Sai O.
 Thanon Pho consisting of sub-district Thanon Pho.
 Makha consisting of sub-district Makha.

References

External links
amphoe.com (Thai)

Non Thai